In house airline of defunct tour operator Best Travel Ltd trading as Grecian and Cypriana Holidays. The fleet were based at Glasgow, Newcastle, Manchester, Birmingham, and Gatwick airports. When Best Travel Ltd went bankrupt on 28 November 1994 the fleet were impounded and operations ceased.

Fleet
G-BRJI  Boeing 757, 
G-BUDX Boeing 757, 
G-SRJG Boeing 757, 
G-BUDZ Boeing 757, 
G-BAZH Boeing 737, 
G-BFVB Boeing 737, 
SX-BSH Airbus A320, 
SX-BSJ Airbus A320

See also
 List of defunct airlines of the United Kingdom

References

External links

Defunct airlines of the United Kingdom
Airlines established in 1992
Airlines disestablished in 1994